Briga Alta is a comune (municipality) in the Province of Cuneo in the Italian region Piedmont.

Geography 

Briga Alta borders the following municipalities: Chiusa di Pesio, Cosio di Arroscia, La Brigue (France), Limone Piemonte, Mendatica, Ormea, Roccaforte Mondovì, Tende (France), and Triora.

See also 
 Passo Tanarello

References 

Cities and towns in Piedmont
France–Italy border crossings